Microeuraphia is a genus of star barnacles in the family Chthamalidae. There are about eight described species in Microeuraphia.

Species
These species belong to the genus Microeuraphia:
 Microeuraphia aestuarii (Stubbings, 1963)
 Microeuraphia apelloefi (Nilsson-Cantell, 1921)
 Microeuraphia depressa (Poli, 1791)
 Microeuraphia eastropacensis (Laguna, 1987)
 Microeuraphia imperatrix (Pilsbry, 1916)
 Microeuraphia permitini (Zevina & Litinova, 1970)
 Microeuraphia rhizophorae (De Oliveira, 1940)
 Microeuraphia withersi (Pilsbry, 1916)

References

External links

 

Barnacles